Xanthophyllum montanum is a tree in the family Polygalaceae. The specific epithet  is from the Latin meaning "mountainous", referring to the tree's habitat.

Description
The smooth bark is orange-yellowish to green. The flowers are yellowish brown when dry.

Distribution and habitat
Xanthophyllum montanum is endemic to Borneo and known only from Mount Kinabalu in Malaysia's Sabah state.

References

montanum
Endemic flora of Borneo
Trees of Borneo
Flora of Sabah
Plants described in 1982